Bawbawgyi Stupa is a Buddhist stupa and one of the oldest Buddhist structures in the history of ancient edifices in Myanmar, located in the Sri Ksetra Archaeological Zone north of the city of Pyay. The stupa was constructed during the Pyu period in the 5th century and is in excellent structural condition, having miraculously survived a number of major earthquakes over the preceding centuries. The history of this stupa is unknown since there were no stone inscription was found.

History
Of uncertain age, the stupa was likely built between the 5th and the 6th centuries when the Pyu people commanded the circular city immediately to the north. Despite its antiquity, the pagoda is in excellent structural condition, having miraculously survived a number of major earthquakes over the preceding centuries.

References 

Buddhist temples in Myanmar
5th-century Buddhist temples
Buddhist pilgrimage sites in Myanmar